Homoeocera multipuncta is a moth of the subfamily Arctiinae. It is found in Brazil.

References

Euchromiina
Moths described in 1931